The Pagelsburg is a hill in the Harz Mountains of central Germany, which lies south of Sieber in the district of Göttingen in Lower Saxony.

Literature 
Kurt Mohr: Sammlung Geologischer Führer Band 58, Harz Westlicher Teil, 5th edition, Stuttgart 1998, pages 146-147

References 

Hills of the Harz
Hills of Lower Saxony